Covini Engineering is an Italian car manufacturer that was formed in 1978 by Ferruccio Covini. The company is generally best known for the Covini C6W, a 6-wheeled sports car that has two axles (four wheels) in the front of the car. This company Is located in Castel San Giovanni, Piacenza.

Covini's first prototype, the Covini T44 Turbo, was a 4x4 off-road vehicle with the exterior body consisting entirely of flat, interchangeable panels. It was powered by a 2,000 cc turbocharged diesel motor. However, the T44 never saw actual production beyond the one prototype. Over the following 20 years, Covini developed several two-door sport cars with diesel engines: the T46, B24, T40, and C36. Only the B24 was produced with about 9 being made (including a few BT424 with Lancia Gamma petrol engine), while the other models remained at prototype level. The B24 was the first diesel car to reach , and the C36 in its final prototype form reached  with its VM Motori diesel engine.

In 2008, after several years of renderings and photographs, Covini officially announced the public release of the C6W. The peculiar 6-wheel format draws inspiration from the Tyrrell P34 Formula One car of the 1970s.

Apart from developing its own prototypes, the organization has also done consulting and design work on other projects. The firm contributed to the redesign of the Cadillac STS for the European market, as well as for the design of the Callaway C7. Outside of the automotive industry, Covini also worked on the Dragonfly Project, which was an attempt to build an ultralight helicopter.

B24

The Covini B24 Turbocooler or Sirio is an experimental car built by Covini Engineering and unveiled to the public in January 1981 at the Geneva Motor Show. It was built to test new technologies such as the air-liquid intercooler. The B24 was powered by a 2.4 L (2,393 cc) VM Motori turbodiesel I4 engine that produces 95 kW (127.4 hp, 130 PS) at 4,300 rpm. The B24 was produced in limited quantities for the U.S. market with about 9 being made (including a few BT424 models with Lancia Gamma petrol engines). It was the first diesel road vehicle to exceed 200 km/h (124 mph), with a top speed of 205 km/h (127 mph)

T40

The Covini T40 Overboost is a car designed by Ferruccio Covini and produced by Covini Engineering between 1985, when it was introduced, and 1988. It is a 4-seater coupe. It was sometimes known by its nickname "Summit", because it is a refined version of the earlier Covini T46, another diesel sports car. The car is powered by a 3.5 L (3,500 cc) VM Motori 5-cylinder Turbo-diesel engine that produces 165 kW (221 hp, 224 PS) at 4,300 rpm. It does 0-100 kmh (0-62 mph) in 7.5 seconds and has a top speed of 235 km/h (146 mph).

C36 

The Covini C36 Turbotronic is a concept car produced by Covini Engineering and introduced in 1998 at the Turin Auto Show. The C36 is powered by a mid-mounted 3.6 L (3,600 cc) VM Motori turbo-diesel I6 engine that produces 170 kW (228 hp, 231 PS) at 4,200 rpm and 320 nm (236 ft lb) of torque at 2,850 rpm. It features a composite body made from a combination of fiberglass and carbon fiber, Brembo brakes and a 6-speed manual transmission.

See also 
Covini C6W
Tyrrell P34
VM Motori

References

External links 
http://www.coviniengineering.com/ - Website for Covini Engineering
https://web.archive.org/web/20090221133645/http://www.covinic6w.com/ - Dedicated home for the C6W

Car manufacturers of Italy
Sports cars
1980s cars
Rear mid-engine, rear-wheel-drive vehicles
Companies based in the Province of Piacenza